Paul Dakeyo (born  1948) is a French-Cameroonian writer.

Dakeyo was born in Bafoussam, Cameroon. In 1969 he moved to Paris, where in 1980 he founded the publishing house Éditions Silex, later Nouvelles du Sud.

Works
Chant d'accusation, 1976
La femme où j’ai mal, 1989
Les ombres de la nuit, 1994
Moroni, cet exil, 2002

References

External links
 Poems

1948 births
Living people
Cameroonian male writers
People from Bafoussam